Rebecca Maria Hall (born 3 May 1982) is an English actress and filmmaker. She made her first onscreen appearance at age 10 in the 1992 television adaptation of The Camomile Lawn, directed by her father, Sir Peter Hall. Her professional stage debut came in her father's 2002 production of Mrs. Warren's Profession, which earned her the Ian Charleson Award.

In 2006, following her film debut in Starter for 10, Hall got her breakthrough role in Christopher Nolan's thriller film The Prestige. In 2008, she starred as Vicky in Woody Allen's romantic comedy-drama Vicky Cristina Barcelona, for which she received a Golden Globe nomination for Best Actress. Hall then appeared in a wide array of films, including Ron Howard's historical drama Frost/Nixon (2008), Ben Affleck's crime drama The Town (2010), the horror thriller The Awakening (2011), the superhero film Iron Man 3 (2013), the science fiction film Transcendence (2014), the psychological thriller The Gift (2015), the live-action/CGI fantasy adventure film The BFG (2016), the biographical drama Professor Marston and the Wonder Women (2017) and the monster film Godzilla vs. Kong (2021). In 2016, Hall was praised by critics for her portrayal of news reporter Christine Chubbuck in the biographical drama Christine. She made her directorial debut with Passing (2021), receiving critical acclaim.

Hall has also made several notable appearances on British television. She won the British Academy Television Award for Best Supporting Actress for the 2009 Channel 4 miniseries Red Riding: 1974. In 2013, she was nominated for the British Academy Television Award for Best Actress for her performance in BBC Two's Parade's End.

Early life and education 
Hall was born on 3 May 1982 in London, the daughter of American opera singer Maria Ewing and English stage director and Royal Shakespeare Company founder Sir Peter Hall. Her mother was born in Detroit, to an African-American mixed-race father and a Dutch mother; she is a descendant of Revolutionary War veteran Bazabeel Norman, a free black man. On Finding Your Roots, Hall discovered that, while her maternal grandfather, Norman Isaac Ewing, had performed as a Native American figure and was recorded as a Sioux chief in newspapers, he had been born to mixed-race African-American parents, and had no Native American ancestry. His own father, Hall's great-grandfather John William Ewing, had been born into slavery and became a prominent figure in Washington, D.C.'s black community. Rebecca has 91% European DNA and 9% sub-Saharan African DNA according to an Ancestry.com DNA test.

Hall's parents separated when she was still young, eventually divorcing in 1990. Hall has five paternal half-siblings: stage director Edward Hall, producer Christopher Hall, actresses Jennifer Caron Hall and Emma Hall, and set designer Lucy Hall.

Hall attended Roedean School, where she became head girl. She studied English literature at St Catharine's College, Cambridge, before dropping out in 2002, just before her final year. During her time at Cambridge, she was active in the student theatre scene and also set up her own theatre company. She was a member of the Marlowe Society and performed in several productions alongside housemate Dan Stevens, an English literature student at Emmanuel College.

Career

Film and television 

Hall's first professional role came in 1992, when she appeared as young Sophy in her father's television adaptation of Mary Wesley's The Camomile Lawn at the age of nine. Her feature film debut came in 2006 as Rebecca Epstein in the film adaptation of David Nicholls's Starter for Ten. She got her breakthrough with the role of Sarah Borden in Christopher Nolan's film The Prestige (2006). She then appeared in Stephen Poliakoff's Joe's Palace in 2007, as well as appearing in several other television films including Wide Sargasso Sea and Rubberheart.

Hall's Hollywood fame grew when she starred in the Woody Allen film Vicky Cristina Barcelona (2008) as one of the title characters, Vicky. Her performance was well-received, and she was nominated for the Golden Globe Award for Best Actress – Motion Picture Musical or Comedy. In 2008, she appeared in Ron Howard's historical drama Frost/Nixon as the girlfriend of Michael Sheen's David Frost. The following year she was cast in the British fantasy-horror film Dorian Gray based on Oscar Wilde's 1890 novel The Picture of Dorian Gray.

Following a small role in the indie film Please Give, Hall starred in Ben Affleck's crime drama The Town (2010) opposite Affleck and Jon Hamm. In June 2010, she won the British Academy Television Award for Best Supporting Actress for her portrayal of Paula Garland in the 2009 Channel 4 production Red Riding: In the Year of Our Lord 1974. The following year she played the female lead in the British ghost film The Awakening, released in September 2011.

In 2012, she took on the role of Beth Raymer in the comedy-drama film Lay the Favourite, based on Raymer's memoir of the same title; one review commented that she "plays Raymer as an endearing force of nature who somehow manages to survive in a dangerous world through sheer force of character." She next starred in the BBC/HBO/VRT production of Parade's End (2012) opposite Benedict Cumberbatch, which earned her a BAFTA Television Award nomination for Best Actress. In 2013, Hall replaced Jessica Chastain as Maya Hansen in the superhero film Iron Man 3. The same year she appeared in the political thriller Closed Circuit (2013). She then starred opposite Johnny Depp in Wally Pfister's directorial debut Transcendence (2014). In 2015, Hall starred in the romantic comedy Tumbledown and Joel Edgerton's directorial debut The Gift.

In the 2016 biographical drama Christine, Hall played the role of real-life news reporter Christine Chubbuck. Variety called her "discomfitingly electric in the best role she's yet been offered".

In 2017, she portrayed Elizabeth Holloway Marston, a real-life psychologist who inspired Wonder Woman, in Professor Marston and the Wonder Women. The same year, Hall joined the cast of A Rainy Day in New York, re-teaming her with Woody Allen. In January 2018, Hall donated her salary to Time's Up after re-reading literature pertaining to the sexual abuse allegation against Woody Allen, stating: "I see not only how complicated this matter is, but that my actions have made another woman feel silenced and dismissed. I regret this decision and wouldn't make the same one today." Hall provided English dub for the character Mother in Mirai (2018).

Beginning the 2020s, Hall starred in and co-executive produced the well-reviewed horror-thriller The Night House, which was released in 2021. The same year, she appeared in the monster film Godzilla vs. Kong and made her directorial debut with the drama Passing, which she also wrote and co-produced. Passing premiered at the 2021 Sundance Film Festival and received critical acclaim, before its distribution rights were acquired by Netflix for approximately $16 million.

Stage 

Hall made her professional stage debut in 2002 when she starred as Vivie in her father's production of Mrs Warren's Profession at the Strand Theatre in London. Her performance, described as "admirable" and "accomplished", earned her the Ian Charleson Award in 2003.

In 2003, Hall's father celebrated 50 years as a theatre director by staging a season of five plays at the Theatre Royal in Bath, Somerset. Hall starred in two of these plays; she appeared as Rosalind in her father's production of As You Like It, which gained her a second Charleson nomination and starred in the title role of Thea Sharrock's revival of D. H. Lawrence's The Fight for Barbara.
In 2004, Hall appeared in three plays for the Peter Hall Company at the Theatre Royal Bath, two of which her father directed: Man and Superman in which she played Ann, and Galileo's Daughter in which she played Sister Maria Celeste. The third, Molière's Don Juan, in which she played the part of Elvira, was directed by Sharrock.

In 2005, Hall reprised the role of Rosalind in a touring production of As You Like It, again under the direction of her father. This tour played the Rose Theatre in Kingston upon Thames, the Brooklyn Academy of Music in New York, the Curran Theatre in San Francisco and the Ahmanson Theatre in Los Angeles. This was a second leg of the U.S. tour that began in 2003 with venues at the Shubert Theater New Haven, Connecticut, Columbus, Ohio, and the Wilbur Theater in Boston.

In 2008–09, Hall appeared in Sam Mendes's first instalment of the Bridge Project as Hermione in The Winter's Tale and as Varya in The Cherry Orchard. The project gave performances with the same cast in Germany, Greece, New Zealand, Singapore, Spain, the United Kingdom and the United States. In 2010–11, she played Viola in a production of Twelfth Night at London's National Theatre, directed by her father.

Hall made her Broadway debut in 2013 in Sophie Treadwell's expressionist play Machinal. The Roundabout Theater production, directed by Lyndsey Turner, began previews on 20 December 2013, with the official opening on 16 January 2014 at the American Airlines Theatre.

Personal life 
In 2010, there was intense media speculation, despite Hall's denials, of an affair between Hall and director Sam Mendes, who was married to Kate Winslet at the time. Hall and Mendes were in a relationship from 2011 to 2013.

In 2014, Hall met actor Morgan Spector while co-starring in a Broadway production. They married in 2015. Their first child was born in 2018.

Filmography

Film

Television

Music videos

Awards and nominations

References

External links 

 
 

1982 births
20th-century English actresses
21st-century English actresses
Actresses from London
Alumni of St Catharine's College, Cambridge
Best Supporting Actress BAFTA Award (television) winners
British emigrants to the United States
English child actresses
English film actresses
English people of African-American descent
English people of Dutch descent
English people of Scottish descent
English stage actresses
English Shakespearean actresses
English television actresses
Ian Charleson Award winners
Living people
People educated at Roedean School, East Sussex
Theatre World Award winners
African-American film directors